Radio Goethe is an American weekly syndicated radio program produced in Oakland, California.

Content
Arndt Peltner hosts Radio Goethe, a weekly radio program that was started in November 1996 on the College Radio Station KUSF, San Francisco. The show features music from Germany, Austria and Switzerland, is non-formatted and non-commercial. The music spans from Rock to Industrial, Electronic and much more. Since 1999 the show has been syndicated on stations in Canada, the US and several countries in Europe.

Radio Goethe has been known to do special features such as a show devoted to the 2006 FIFA World Cup where different host cities were presented, and more recently six music shows for the "Wunderbar Together" events, the "Deutschlandjahr" in the USA.

In 2004 Arndt Peltner was awarded for his cultural work with 'Radio Goethe' with the "Bundesverdienstkreuz", the Merit of Order, of the Federal Republic of Germany.

Peltner lives in Oakland and is a native of Germany.

Availability
Pre-made hour-long selections are played over the following stations:

 CFUV: Victoria, British Columbia, Canada
 CFXU: Antigonish, Nova Scotia, Canada
 CHMA: Sackville, New Brunswick, Canada
 CHMR: St. John's, Newfoundland and Labrador, Canada
 CHSR: Fredericton, New Brunswick, Canada
 CJSF: Burnaby, British Columbia, Canada
 CKLU: Sudbury, Ontario, Canada
 Hitradio Namibia:  Windhoek, Namibia
 KAMP: Tucson, Arizona, United States
 KAOS: Olympia, Washington, United States
 KBVR: Corvallis, Oregon, United States
 KCFV: St. Louis, Missouri, United States
 KMSC: Moorhead, Minnesota, United States
 KMSM: Butte, Montana, United States
 KPSU: Portland, Oregon, United States
 KRYZ: Mariposa, California, United States
 KSPC: Claremont, California, United States
 KUMM: Morris, Minnesota, United States
 KUSF: San Francisco, California, United States
 KWMR: Point Reyes Station, California
 PRX: Public Radio Exchange
 WBDG: Indianapolis, Indiana, United States
 WCLH: Wilkes-Barre, Pennsylvania, United States
 WCRD: Muncie, Indiana, United States
 WRHO: Oneonta, New York, United States
 WRRG: River Grove, Illinois, United States
 WSUM: Madison, Wisconsin, United States
 WSYC: Shippensburg, Pennsylvania, United States
 WUTS: Sewanee, Tennessee, United States

See also

 Culture of San Francisco
 List of U.S. radio programs
 Radio in the United States

External links
 , the program's official website
 , the official website of KUSF

Year of work missing
American music radio programs
American news radio programs
Culture of San Francisco
Johann Wolfgang von Goethe
University of San Francisco